Wrath is a 1917 American silent drama film directed by Theodore Marston and starring H.B. Warner, Edith Hallor, and Shirley Mason.

Cast

References

Bibliography
 Robert B. Connelly. The Silents: Silent Feature Films, 1910-36, Volume 40, Issue 2. December Press, 1998.

External links
 

1917 films
1917 drama films
1910s English-language films
American silent feature films
Silent American drama films
American black-and-white films
Films directed by Theodore Marston
Triangle Film Corporation films
1910s American films